Daniel Quizon (born 2004) is a Filipino chess player and is the current Philippine Chess Champion.  He was awarded the title of International Master (IM) by FIDE in 2018.

He qualified to play for the Chess World Cup 2021 where he was defeated 1.5-0.5 by Evgeny Bareev in the first round.

References

External links 
 
 Daniel Quizon chess games at 365Chess.com
 

2004 births
Living people
Filipino chess players